Spontaneous symmetry breaking, a vacuum Higgs field, and its associated fundamental particle the Higgs boson are quantum phenomena. A vacuum Higgs field is responsible for spontaneous symmetry breaking the gauge symmetries of fundamental interactions and provides the Higgs mechanism of generating mass of elementary particles.

At the same time, classical gauge theory admits comprehensive geometric formulation where gauge fields are represented by connections on principal bundles. In this framework, spontaneous symmetry breaking is characterized as a reduction of the structure group  of a principal bundle  to its closed subgroup . By the well-known theorem, such a reduction takes place if and only if there exists a global section  of the quotient bundle . This section is treated as a classical Higgs field.

A key point is that there exists a composite bundle  where  is a principal bundle with the structure group . Herewith, a Lagrangian of these matter fields is gauge invariant only if it factorizes through the vertical covariant differential of some connection on a principal bundle , but not .

An example of a classical Higgs field is a classical gravitational field identified with a pseudo-Riemannian metric on a world manifold .

See also 
 Gauge gravitation theory
 Reduction of the structure group
 Spontaneous symmetry breaking

Bibliography

External links
 G. Sardanashvily, Geometry of classical Higgs fields, Int. J. Geom. Methods Mod. Phys. 3 (2006) 139; .

Theoretical physics
Gauge theories
Symmetry